Doras micropoeus is a species of thorny catfish found in Guyana and Suriname and questionably in French Guiana.  This species grows to a length of  SL.

References
 

Doradidae
Catfish of South America
Fish of Guyana
Fish of Suriname
Fish described in 1912
Taxa named by Carl H. Eigenmann